Zala is an administrative county (comitatus or vármegye) in south-western Hungary. It is named after the Zala River. It shares borders with Croatia (Koprivnica–Križevci and Međimurje Counties) and Slovenia (Lendava and Moravske Toplice) and the Hungarian counties Vas, Veszprém and Somogy. Lake Balaton lies partly in the county.

History

In the tenth century, the Hungarian Nyék tribe occupied the region around Lake Balaton. Their occupation was mainly in the areas known today as Zala and Somogy counties.

Parts of the western territory of the former county of Zala are now part of Slovenia (South-Prekmurje) and Croatia (Međimurje). In 1919 it was part of the unrecognized state of the Republic of Prekmurje, which existed for just six days.

Demographics

Ethnicity
Besides the Hungarian majority, the main minorities are the Roma (approx. 7,000), Croats (3,500) and Germans (2,000).

Total population (2011 census): 282,179
Ethnic groups (2011 census):
Identified themselves: 255 069 persons:
Hungarians: 241 408 (94,64%)
Gypsies: 6 981 (2,74%)
Croats: 3 248 (1,27%)
Others and indefinable: 3 432 (1,35%)
Approx. 38,000 persons in Zala County did not declare their ethnic group at the 2011 census.

Religion

Religious adherence in the county according to 2011 census:

Catholic – 177,072 (Roman Catholic – 176,721; Greek Catholic – 313);
Reformed – 7,000;
Evangelical – 3,928;
other religions – 2,463; 
Non-religious – 23,119; 
Atheism – 2,272;
Undeclared – 66,325.

Regional structure

Politics 
The Zala County Council, elected at the 2014 local government elections, is made up of 15 counselors, with the following party composition:

Presidents of the General Assembly

Municipalities 
Zala County has two urban counties, eight towns, two large villages and 246 villages.

City with county rights
(ordered by population, as of 2011 census)
  Zalaegerszeg (59,499)
  Nagykanizsa (49,026)

Towns

  Keszthely (20,619)
  Lenti (7,940)
  Zalaszentgrót (6,626)
  Hévíz (4,715)
  Letenye (4,192)
  Zalalövő (3,006)
  Zalakaros (1,756)
  Pacsa (1,711)

Villages

 Alibánfa
 Almásháza
 Alsónemesapáti
 Alsópáhok
 Alsórajk
 Alsószenterzsébet
 Babosdöbréte
 Baglad
 Bagod
 Bak
 Baktüttös
 Balatongyörök
 Balatonmagyaród
 Bánokszentgyörgy
 Barlahida
 Batyk
 Bázakerettye
 Becsehely
 Becsvölgye
 Belezna
 Belsősárd
 Bezeréd
 Bocfölde
 Bocska
 Boncodfölde
 Borsfa
 Bókaháza
 Böde
 Bödeháza
 Börzönce
 Búcsúszentlászló
 Bucsuta
 Csapi
 Csatár
 Cserszegtomaj
 Csertalakos
 Csesztreg
 Csonkahegyhát
 Csöde
 Csömödér
 Csörnyeföld
 Dióskál
 Dobri
 Dobronhegy
 Döbröce
 Dötk
 Egeraracsa
 Egervár
 Eszteregnye
 Esztergályhorváti
 Felsőpáhok
 Felsőrajk
 Felsőszenterzsébet
 Fityeház
 Fűzvölgy
 Galambok
 Garabonc
 Gáborjánháza
 Gellénháza
 Gelse
 Gelsesziget
 Gétye
 Gombosszeg
 Gosztola
 Gősfa
 Gutorfölde
 Gyenesdiás 
 Gyűrűs
 Hagyárosbörönd
 Hahót
 Hernyék
 Homokkomárom
 Hosszúvölgy
 Hottó
 Iborfia
 Iklódbördőce
 Kacorlak
 Kallósd
 Karmacs
 Kálócfa
 Kányavár
 Kávás
 Kehidakustány
 Kemendollár
 Keménfa
 Kerecseny
 Kerkabarabás
 Kerkafalva
 Kerkakutas
 Kerkaszentkirály
 Kerkateskánd
 Kilimán
 Kisbucsa
 Kiscsehi
 Kisgörbő
 Kiskutas
 Kispáli
 Kisrécse
 Kissziget
 Kistolmács
 Kisvásárhely
 Kozmadombja
 Kustánszeg
 Külsősárd
 Lakhegy
 Lasztonya
 Lendvadedes
 Lendvajakabfa
 Lickóvadamos
 Ligetfalva
 Lispeszentadorján
 Liszó
 Lovászi
 Magyarföld
 Magyarszentmiklós
 Magyarszerdahely
 Maróc
 Márokföld
 Miháld
 Mihályfa
 Mikekarácsonyfa
 Milejszeg
 Misefa
 Molnári
 Murakeresztúr
 Murarátka
 Muraszemenye
 Nagybakónak
 Nagygörbő
 Nagykapornak
 Nagykutas
 Nagylengyel
 Nagypáli
 Nagyrada
 Nagyrécse
 Nemesapáti
 Nemesbük
 Nemeshetés
 Nemesnép
 Nemespátró
 Nemesrádó
 Nemessándorháza
 Nemesszentandrás
 Németfalu
 Nova
 Oltárc
 Orbányosfa
 Ormándlak
 Orosztony
 Ortaháza
 Ozmánbük
 Óhíd
 Padár
 Pakod
 Pat
 Páka
 Pálfiszeg
 Pethőhenye
 Petrikeresztúr
 Petrivente
 Pókaszepetk
 Pórszombat
 Pölöske
 Pölöskefő
 Pördefölde
 Pötréte
 Pusztaapáti
 Pusztaederics
 Pusztamagyaród
 Pusztaszentlászló
 Ramocsa
 Resznek
 Rezi
 Rédics
 Rigyác
 Salomvár
 Sand
 Sárhida
 Sármellék
 Semjénháza
 Sénye
 Sormás
 Söjtör
 Sümegcsehi
 Surd
 Szalapa
 Szécsisziget
 Szentgyörgyvár
 Szentgyörgyvölgy
 Szentkozmadombja
 Szentliszló
 Szentmargitfalva
 Szentpéterfölde
 Szentpéterúr
 Szepetnek
 Szijártóháza
 Szilvágy
 Teskánd
 Tilaj
 Tófej
 Tormafölde
 Tornyiszentmiklós
 Tótszentmárton
 Tótszerdahely
 Türje
 Újudvar
 Valkonya
 Vasboldogasszony
 Vaspör
 Vállus
 Várfölde
 Várvölgy
 Vindornyafok
 Vindornyalak
 Vindornyaszőlős
 Vonyarcvashegy 
 Vöckönd
 Zajk
 Zalaapáti
 Zalabaksa
 Zalabér
 Zalaboldogfa
 Zalacsány
 Zalacséb
 Zalaháshágy
 Zalaigrice
 Zalaistvánd
 Zalakomár
 Zalaköveskút
 Zalamerenye
 Zalasárszeg
 Zalaszabar
 Zalaszántó
 Zalaszentbalázs
 Zalaszentgyörgy
 Zalaszentiván
 Zalaszentjakab
 Zalaszentlászló
 Zalaszentlőrinc
 Zalaszentmárton
 Zalaszentmihály
 Zalaszombatfa
 Zalatárnok
 Zalaújlak
 Zalavár
 Zalavég
 Zebecke

 municipalities are large villages.

Gallery

References

External links

 Official site in Hungarian and German
 Zalai Hírlap (zaol.hu) - The county portal

 
Counties of Hungary